Henry Leung (born 10 March 1995) is a Hong Kong professional squash player. As of September 2022, he is ranked number 58 in the world.

References

1995 births
Living people
Hong Kong male squash players
Asian Games medalists in squash
Asian Games silver medalists for Hong Kong
Squash players at the 2018 Asian Games
Medalists at the 2018 Asian Games